The cordilleran canastero (Asthenes modesta) is a species of bird in the family Furnariidae. It is found in Argentina, Bolivia, Chile, and Peru. Its natural habitats are temperate grassland and subtropical or tropical high-altitude grassland.

Seven subspecies are recognized:
Asthenes modesta proxima (Chapman, 1921) - Peru
Asthenes modesta modesta (Eyton, 1852) - Argentina, Bolivia, Chile, and Peru
Asthenes modesta hilereti (Oustalet, 1904) - Tucumán and Catamarca, Argentina
Asthenes modesta rostrata (von Berlepsch, 1901) - Bolivia
A. m. serrana Nores, 1986 - Argentina
Asthenes modesta cordobae Nores & Yzurieta, 1980 - Argentina. Includes former subspecies A. m. navasi (Remsen, 2003)
Asthenes modesta australis Hellmayr, 1925 - Chile and Argentina

References

cordilleran canastero
Birds of the Puna grassland
Birds of the Southern Andes
Birds of Argentina
Birds of Chile
Birds of Patagonia
cordilleran canastero
cordilleran canastero
Taxonomy articles created by Polbot